Philippe Government may refer to:

 First Philippe government, the French government under President Emmanuel Macron from May to June 2017
 Second Philippe government, the French government under President Emmanuel Macron since June 2017